Eastern Rebellion is an album by Eastern Rebellion led by pianist Cedar Walton which was recorded in late 1975 and became the first release on the Dutch Timeless label.

Reception

AllMusic awarded the album 4½ stars noting "The veteran musicians all sound quite inspired on this advanced straightahead set" and calling it "A gem". The Penguin Guide to Jazz described it as "one of the pianist's finest albums".

Track listing 
All compositions by Cedar Walton except as indicated
 "Bolivia" – 10:10  
 "Naima" (John Coltrane) – 8:37  
 "5/4 Thing" (George Coleman) – 7:53  
 "Bittersweet" (Sam Jones) – 6:54  
 "Mode for Joe" – 7:51

Personnel 
Cedar Walton – piano 
George Coleman – tenor saxophone
Sam Jones – bass
Billy Higgins – drums

References 

Eastern Rebellion albums
1976 albums
Timeless Records albums